The Abu Dhabi Investment Council (The Council) is an investment arm of the Government of Abu Dhabi. It started operations in April 2007 and is responsible for investing part of the government's surplus financial resources through a globally diversified investment strategy, targeting positive capital returns through an expansive portfolio of highly diversified asset classes and active investment management strategies.

History
The Abu Dhabi Investment Council was splintered off from the Abu Dhabi Investment Authority (ADIA) in 2007 and took over all local subsidiaries previously owned by ADIA including Abu Dhabi Commercial Bank, National Bank of Abu Dhabi and Abu Dhabi Investment Company (Invest AD). Since Autumn 2013 the Council has been based at Al Bahr Towers.

Investment strategy

The investment strategy of the Council seeks to achieve superior risk-adjusted returns across the entire capital structure while preserving capital. Although the Council invests globally, there is a strong focus of investing in Abu Dhabi's economy. Some of its significant investments include:
 National Bank of Abu Dhabi
 Abu Dhabi Commercial Bank
 Union National Bank
 Al Hilal Bank
 Abu Dhabi National Insurance Company
 Abu Dhabi Aviation Company
 Abu Dhabi Investment Company (Invest AD)
 Abu Dhabi National Chemicals Company

Notably in 2008, the Council acquired 90% ownership of New York's landmark Chrysler Building.

Business functions

Office of the Managing Director

The Managing Director is the highest-ranking officer within the Council. He reports to the board of directors and is responsible for the operations of the Council.

Active Investment Strategies

The Active Investment Strategies Department aims to generate superior risk adjusted returns by investing in hedge funds and similar active trading mandates across different strategies, globally. The department co-invests in individual transactions by partnering with Hedge Funds and takes GP stakes in Hedge Funds and/or Seed Hedge Funds. Some of the global mainstream strategies include:

 Relative Value Strategies
 Hedged Equity Strategies
 Macro Strategies
 Event Driven Strategies
 Systematic CTA

Direct Investments

The Direct Investments Department invests directly in listed and unlisted companies across the globe, with a particular emphasis on the MENA Region. It is focused on creating a concentrated portfolio of highly uncorrelated securities reflecting the broad nature of investment opportunities the Council is exposed to. In this respect, investments are considered for their intrinsic characteristics rather than within a portfolio context. In addition, it is also responsible for monitoring and optimizing the value of the Council's legacy portfolio consisting of 12 investments in local financial institutions and other prominent companies.

Equities and Fixed Income

The Equities and Fixed Income Department manages listed portfolios concentrated in the following areas:

 Equities that include Global and Regional Large Cap Equities, Emerging Market Equities and Small Cap Equities
 Fixed Income that includes Sovereign, Global Inflation Linked, Credit and Emerging Debt Securities

Global Special Situations

The Special Situations Unit invests in one-off opportunities that may not fit in any of the council's asset classifications yet generate a higher return than other asset classes. These investments are placed both directly and through managed funds.

Infrastructure Investments

The Infrastructure Investments Department is responsible for building a portfolio of global infrastructure investments as well as contributing to the growth of the local economy through participation in local developments. Its investments target large-scale public systems that are vital to countries’ economies including transportation, communication, utilities & power and social infrastructures (i.e. schools and hospitals). Exposure to these investments is gained through externally managed funds, but also includes the possibility of co-investments in suitable infrastructure projects.

Real Estate

The Real Estate Department invests in global markets through externally managed funds as well as targeted direct investments by building relationships with managers, deploying stringent selection criteria, and executing a broad diversification strategy with respect to geography, size, timing and investment philosophy.

Private Equity

The Private Equity Department places funds in global private equity markets and invests directly primarily alongside its managers.

Support Functions

Various functions support the investment and non-investment activities of the Council. They include:

 Accounting & Financial Services providing cash management, investment accounting and reporting, and custodial services
 Human Resources providing recruitment, talent management, and career development services
 Information Technology providing platform, systems, solutions, and data services
 General Services providing logistics and facilities support services
 Management Accounts providing payroll, accounts payables, and expense management services

Board of directors

The Board of Directors is the highest authority within the Council and is composed of a Chairman, Managing Director and other board members, all of whom are senior government officials appointed by Decree from the Ruler of Abu Dhabi.
 
Chairman of the Board:

Sheikh Mohammad Bin Zayed Al Nahyan

Members of the Board:

Sheikh Sultan Bin Zayed Al Nahyan

Sheikh Mansour Bin Zayed Al Nahyan

Sheikh Hamed Bin Zayed Al Nahyan

Mohammed Bin Habroush Al Suwaidi

Eissa Mohamed Al Suwaidi (managing director)

Younis Haji Khoori 
 
MR SHUBHRAW PRATAP DASGUPTA (Member of Group Consultant to Sheikh Sultan Bin Zayed Al Nahyan or Board)

See also
 Abu Dhabi Fund for Development

References

External links
 Abu Dhabi Investment Council

Investment companies of the United Arab Emirates
Government-owned companies of Abu Dhabi
Sovereign wealth funds
2007 establishments in the United Arab Emirates
Outward investment